The Corsican citron (called alimea in Corsican and cedrat in French) is a citron variety that contains a non-acidic pulp.

The name is from its most original cultivation center which is even today, at the French Island of Corsica or Corse. It is said to be one of the first citrus fruit to reach the Corsican soil.

History, production and uses
Traditionally, it was one of the most important varieties employed in Succade production. The fruit used to be shipped to Genoa, Italy, where it was de-pulped in the large centers in Livorno, hence its name the Citron of Commerce.

With 45,000 tons per year, Corsica was once the world's leading producer of citron. The historian Laurence Pinelli explains:

Etrog
For a short period of time Genoese merchants, who always supplied fruit for the Jewish ritual of Etrog, used to ship also some amount of this Corsican variety, while there was not enough available from Diamante. This tradition terminated due to competition with the Greek citron which was considered to be of extraordinary beauty.

Today, the citron is cooked with sugar to produce a jam.

Description

It is medium-thorny with some large, stout spines. The very fragrant blossom appears in March–April and lasts until September, producing good honey with honey bees. Flowers, buds and new growth are not purple-tinted.

The tree produces large fruit, ellipsoid to very slightly obovate; basal area slightly depressed and radially furrowed; apical nipple suppressed or indistinct. The fruit is lemon-yellow when ripe. Its rind is very thick and fleshy, sweet with some bitter after-taste; surface rather rough, bumpy, and commonly somewhat ribbed. The flesh of the fruit is crisp and solid, lacking in juice; it has a sweet flavour without acid. The seeds are white-yellowish.

References

External links
 Citrons and their hybrids U.C. Riverside
 Citrus medica Purdue University
 Alimea
 Citrons Citrus Pages
 Citrus medica Home Citrus Growers
 Plant Immigrants
 The Cultivated Oranges and Lemons
 The Pharmaceutical Journal-Consular report
 Citron Leaves book, the trade of Corsican citrons through Leghorn and/or the United States
 The Gardeners Chronicle
 Biennial Report
 Report Google Books
 Parliamentary Papers
 The Dublin REview
 Monthly Consular
 Bulletin Victoria
 Science

Citron
Citrus
Flora of Corsica